Little Kiska Island is an island off east coast of the island of Kiska in the Rat Islands (part of the Aleutian Islands)in Alaska. It lies immediately east of Kiska Harbor it is approximately 6 kilometers long and 2 kilometers wide. The island has multiple hills, creeks, and ranges which were all mapped by the U.S. Navy for military purposes during WWII.

One of the creeks on the island drew notoriety for being named "Nazi Creek".

Notes

References
Morison, Samuel Eliot. History of United States Naval Operations in World War II, Volume Seven: Aleutians, Gilberts, and Marshalls, June 1942-April 1944. Boston, Massachusetts: Little, Brown and Company, 1951.

Islands of the Aleutian Islands
Islands of Aleutians West Census Area, Alaska
Islands of Alaska
Islands of Unorganized Borough, Alaska